David Andelman may refer to:

 David A. Andelman (born 1944), American journalist
 David Andelman (physicist) (born 1955), Israeli theoretical physicist
 David R. Andelman (born 1940), American attorney